The Khudan (also: Худун, Кудун, Кодун) is a river in Buryatia, southern East Siberia, Russia.

Its average flow rate at the mouth is 12.7 m³/s.

Course
The Khudan is a left tributary of the Uda, of the Selenga basin. The Khudan flows roughly in a WNW direction and meets the Uda  from its mouth in the Selenga. The river is generally frozen from mid-October or early November until April or May.

See also
List of rivers of Russia

References 

Rivers of Buryatia